The Octagonal mausoleum or Gyuloglylar mausoleum is a mausoleum located in Gyuloglylar, Barda, in Azerbaijan. It was built in the 18th century.

See also
 Architecture of Azerbaijan

References

External links
 Qasım Hacıyev, Bərdə şəhəri. Coğrafi, siyasi və mədəni tarixi, Baku, "UniPrint", 2008. 

Buildings and structures in Azerbaijan
Tourist attractions in Azerbaijan